George Albert Snow (August 1, 1923 – April 7, 2020) was a Canadian politician. He represented the electoral district of Yarmouth in the Nova Scotia House of Assembly from 1963 to 1974. He was a member of the Nova Scotia Progressive Conservative Party. Snow was born in Port Maitland, Nova Scotia and was a lobster fisherman. He married Marjorie Louise Harris in 1947. Snow died of pneumonia in Yarmouth, Nova Scotia in 2020.

References

1923 births
2020 deaths
Progressive Conservative Association of Nova Scotia MLAs
People from Yarmouth County